The Albian is both an age of the geologic timescale and a stage in the stratigraphic column. It is the youngest or uppermost subdivision of the Early/Lower Cretaceous Epoch/Series. Its approximate time range is 113.0 ± 1.0 Ma to 100.5 ± 0.9 Ma (million years ago). The Albian is preceded by the Aptian and followed by the Cenomanian.

Stratigraphic definitions
The Albian Stage was first proposed in 1842 by Alcide d'Orbigny. It was named after Alba, the Latin name for River Aube in France.

A Global Boundary Stratotype Section and Point (GSSP), ratified by the IUGS in 2016, defines the base of the Albian as the first occurrence of the planktonic foraminiferan Microhedbergella renilaevis at the Col de Pré-Guittard section, Arnayon, Drôme, France.

The top of the Albian Stage (the base of the Cenomanian Stage and Upper Cretaceous Series) is defined as the place where the foram species Rotalipora globotruncanoides first appears in the stratigraphic column.

The Albian is sometimes subdivided in Early/Lower, Middle and Late/Upper subages or substages. In western Europe, especially in the United Kingdom, a subdivision in two substages (Vraconian and Gaultian) is more often used.

Examples
Examples of Albian sedimentary rock are: the phosphorite beds of the Argonne and Bray areas in France; the Flammenmergel of northern Germany; the lignites of Utrillas in Spain; the Upper Nubian Sandstones, and the Fredericksburg beds of North America.

References

Notes

Literature
; 2004: A Geologic Time Scale 2004, Cambridge University Press.
; 2004: The Global Boundary Stratotype Section and Point (GSSP) for the base of the Cenomanian Stage, Mont Risou, Hautes-Alpes, France, Episodes 27, pp. 21–32.
; 1842: Paléontologie française: Terrains crétacés, vol. ii.

External links
GeoWhen Database - Albian
Mid-Cretaceous timescale, at the website of the subcommission for stratigraphic information of the ICS (The top of the Albian stage is also still visible on their Late Cretaceous timescale)
Stratigraphic chart of the Lower Cretaceous, at the website of Norges Network of offshore records of geology and stratigraphy
 Albian Stage, Cretaceous Period in Hampshire

 
06
Geological ages
Cretaceous geochronology